The Buller by-election 1962 was a by-election held in the  electorate in the West Coast during the term of the 33rd New Zealand Parliament, on 7 July 1962.

The by-election was caused by the death of incumbent MP Jerry Skinner of the Labour Party (and a likely future leader) on 26 April 1962. The by-election was won by Bill Rowling, also of the Labour Party (and a future leader). The Social Credit candidate P. H. Matthews was also the leader of the party.

Date
The initial date of the by-election announced by the Prime Minister Keith Holyoake was 21 July, contrary to expectations it would be early to mid June, by extending the time allowed for the issue of the writ in order to coincide with another by-election in Timaru. The Leader of the Opposition Walter Nash criticized the decision saying it was a "nullification of democracy" and motivated to place the election after the budget to allow the government to spend its money electioneering. The Social Credit Party were also critical of the decision claiming National were frightened following its decreased majorities at the recent by-elections in Hurunui and Waitaki. The decision to delay was later threatened on legal grounds by the Labour Party who challenged it in the Supreme Court. The government backed down and changed the date to 7 July.

Candidates

Labour
There were several names put forward as potential Labour nominees for the Labour Party candidacy:

Mr M. Organ, a Labour Party member formerly of the Westport branch
Robert Philp, the chairman of the Buller County Council
Neville Pickering, the former MP for 
Claude Rielly, of the Takaka branch of the Labour Party
Terry Skinner, Secretary of the Southern Buller Labour Representation Committee (Jerry Skinner's son)
Philip Skoglund, the former MP for Palmerston North and Minister of Education

Rielly declined the invitation to seek the nomination and Philp withdrew after he suffered a mild stroke. Rowling was chosen after winning a ballot of local party members at a meeting of party members in Murchison.

National
Two people sought the National Party candidature.

Ernie King, a stud stock specialist from Appleby who was National's candidate for Buller in 1960
Mr C. M. Robertson, a company manager from Westport

King was chosen as the National candidate after winning a ballot of members at a meeting in Motueka.

Social Credit
The Social Credit Party chose P. H. Matthews as their candidate. Matthews was leader of the party and had contested Buller in both 1957 and 1960.

Campaign
The New Zealand Broadcasting Corporation announced there would be no pre-election addresses broadcast in the by-election but would have full coverage of the polling results.

Results
The following table gives the election results:

Notes

References

Buller 1962
1962 elections in New Zealand
Politics of the West Coast, New Zealand
July 1962 events in New Zealand